Wallace Wesley McIlwain (January 20, 1903 – June 30, 1963) was an American football player and coach.  He played professionally in the National Football League (NFL) for the Racine Tornadoes. In 1926, he was a player-coach for the Tornadoes. Prior to his professional career, McIlwain played college football at the University of Illinois, alongside Red Grange.

References

 

1903 births
1963 deaths
American football halfbacks
Illinois Fighting Illini football players
Racine Tornadoes players
Racine Legion coaches
People from Highland Park, Illinois
Players of American football from Illinois